Phuket (or) is a city in the southeast of Phuket Island, Thailand. It is the capital of Phuket province.  the city had a population of 79,308. It covers the subdistricts (tambons) Talat Yai and Talat Nuea of Mueang Phuket district.

Phuket is 862 km (535.6 mi) south of Bangkok.

History
Phuket is one of the oldest cities in Thailand. It was an important port on the west of the Malay Peninsula where Chinese immigrants first landed.

Phuket Old Town is a quarter studded with heritage buildings in ten streets: Klang, Phang Nga, Rassada, Dee Buk, Krabi, Thep Kasattri, Phuket, Yaowarat, Satun, and Soi Rammanee. These older buildings show Phuket town's former prosperity. They were constructed when tin mining was an important industry on the island. Their architectural style is called "Sino-Portuguese", characteristic of which is a single or two-storey building with a narrow front compensated for by considerable depth. The tiles, doors, perforated windows, and other details are all influenced by Chinese and European styles combined. "Phuket Old Town" is a  2.7 km2 area covering a total of 210 rai.

, the Fine Arts Department and the Phuket provincial authorities are preparing a proposal to the United Nations Educational, Scientific and Cultural Organization (UNESCO) for Phuket Old Town to be listed as a World Heritage Site.

In 2004 the town was elevated to city status (thesaban nakhon).

Culture  

The major religion is Buddhism. The Buddhist temples in the city are attractive destinations for national and international tourists. Along the streets some Hindu temples depicting the statues of Ganesha and Brahma can also be seen.

Demographics 
Since 2005, the population of Phuket has been increasing.

Transportation
Phuket International Airport

Sister cities
  Las Vegas, Nevada, United States
 George Town, Penang, Malaysia

Photos

References

External links

 Forbes, Andrew, and Henley, David, Phuket's Historic Peranakan Community
 Phuket City official website 

 
Cities and towns in Thailand
Andaman Sea
Ports and harbours in Southeast Asia
Port cities in Asia
Port cities and towns of the Indian Ocean
Southern Thailand